PAJAM is an American songwriting and production team, made up of Paul Allen, J. Moss and Walter Kearney, all of Detroit, Michigan. The team works with gospel, soul and R&B artists.

They are best known for producing the 1997 debut album Finally Karen recorded by Karen Clark Sheard, which reached #2 on the U.S. Billboard Gospel Albums chart.

Subsequently, PAJAM has worked with over 50 artists, including Marvin Sapp, Byron Cage, Kierra "Kiki" Sheard, Winans Phase II, Trin-i-tee 5:7, 21:03, and Hezekiah Walker, as well as secular artists such as Kelly Price, Boyz II Men, Dru Hill, Patti LaBelle and NSYNC.

Production discography

1997
 Karen Clark Sheard - Finally Karen
 "Praise Festival"
 "Unconditional (Mad Love)"
 "Gotta Right..."
 "Can't Take It"

1998
 7 Mile - 7 Mile
 Dawkins & Dawkins - Focus
 "Child of God"
 "Not Just Anybody"
 Greg O'Quin 'N Joyful Noyze - Conversations
 "Know You"
 "That Name"
 "Dry Your Eyes"
 "Never"

1999
 Angelo & Veronica - Change
 Hezekiah Walker & the Love Fellowship Crusade Choir - Family Affair
 "Let's Dance"
 "He Can"
 "More Like Him"
 "Give'em Your Life"
 Marvin Sapp - Nothing Else Matters
 "Do Your Dance"
 "Thank You Lord"
 Men of Standard - Feels Like Rain
 "Nothing Like Heaven"
 "God Take Care of Me"
 "Feels Like Rain"
 The Mighty Clouds of Joy - It Was You
 "Never Say"
 "Miracle"
 Nancey Jackson - Relationships
 "Relationship"
 "Delicate Heart"
 Winans Phase 2 - We Got Next

2000
 Kelly Price - Mirror Mirror
 "You Should've Told Me"

2001
 Sisqó - Return of Dragon
 "Without You" 
 *NSYNC - Celebrity
 "Do Your Thing"

2002
 3rd Storee - Get With Me
 "Now I Can Breathe"
 "I'm Sorry"
 "Don't Lose Hope"
 "How Can This Be"
 Boyz II Men - Full Circle
 "I'll Show You"
 Dorinda Clark-Cole - Dorinda Clark-Cole
 "No Not One"
 "It's Not Me"
 "You Can"
 "You Need Him"
 Dru Hill - Dru World Order
 "Old Love"  
 Hezekiah Walker & the Love Fellowship Crusade Choir - Family Affair II: Live at Radio City Music Hall
 "Don't Wait"
 "Breakthrough"
 Karen Clark Sheard - 2nd Chance
 "Be Sure"
 "So Good"
 "2nd Chance"
 The Mighty Clouds of Joy - I Want to Thank You
 "Seeking the Fire"
 "New Creature"
 Pam & Dodi - Pam & Dodi
 "There All the Time"
 Trin-i-tee 5:7 - The Kiss
 "Holla"
 "Holla (Urban Remix)"
 Vanessa Williams - Vanessa
 "Think Again"

2003
 Karen Clark Sheard - The Heavens Are Telling
 "Go Ahead" featuring Missy Elliott
 "Praise Up"
 "I Owe"
 "Sometimes"
 "Don't Change" featuring Kierra Kiki Sheard
 Percy Bady - The Percy Bady Experience
 "Free"
 "Hold Up the Light (Urban Remix)"
 The Straight Gate Mass Choir - Expectations: I'll Raise
 "Jumpstart"
 "Work Your Faith"
 Virtue - Free
 "Thankful"
 "You'll Win If You Try"
 "He's Able"

2004
 J. Moss - The J. Moss Project (album producers)
 Kierra Kiki Sheard - I Owe You
 "Church Nite"
 "Closer"
 "Praise Offering"
 "So Long"
 Michelle Williams - Do You Know
 "The Way of Love"
 Patti LaBelle - Timeless Journey
 "More Than Material"
 Ramiyah - Ramiyah (album producers)
 Vanessa Williams - Here I Go Again!

2005
 Byron Cage - An Invitation to Worship (album producers)

2006
 21:03 - PAJAM Presents 21:03 (album producers)
 Antwaun Stanley - I Can Do Anything (album producers)
 Dave Hollister - The Book of David, Vol. 1: The Transition
 "Pray (Til I Get an Answer)"
 Karen Clark Sheard - It's Not Over
 "Be Blessed"
 "You Showed Me"
 Kierra Sheard - This Is Me
 "Wrong Things"
 "Scream"
 Patti LaBelle - The Gospel According to Patti LaBelle
 "More Than (He Loves You)" featuring J. Moss

2007
 Bobby Jones - The Ambassador
 "Thank You Lord"
 "Call Him Up Love Peace & Joy"
 Byron Cage - Live at the Apollo: The Proclamation (album producers)
 Darlene McCoy - Darlene McCoy
 "If There Were No You"
 J. Moss - V2... (album producers)
 PAJAM Presents Sing To The Lord (album producers)
 Vanessa Bell Armstrong - Walking Miracle
 "Seasons"

2008
 21:03 - Total Attention (album producers)
 Dorinda Clark-Cole - Take It Back
 "Return"
 Kierra Kiki Sheard - Bold Right Life
 "Praise Him Now"

2009
 Crystal Aikin - Crystal Aikin
 "What If"  
 J. Moss - Just James (album producers)
 Melinda Watts - People Get Ready
 "Happy"
 Shirley Caesar - A City Called Heaven
 "Nobody"

2010
 J. Moss - Remixed, Rare & Unreleashed (album producers)
 Karen Clark Sheard - All in One
 "I Made a Choice"
 "Good"
 "Because of You"
 "What He Did"
 "He Knows"
 "All For One"
 Y'Anna - The Promise
 "I'm Blessed"

2011
 21:03 - Evolved: From Boys to Men (album producers)

2012
 James Fortune & FIYA - Identity
 "Throw My Hands Up"
 J. Moss - V4...The Other Side (album producers)

2013
 Earnest Pugh - The W.I.N. (Worship In Nassau) Experience
 "I Believe You Most"

References

External links
PAJAM. Official site
Gospel City: PAJAM Partners With Gospo Centric Records
ASCAP members enjoy a Stellarbration at the 21st Stellar Gospel Music Awards
United by One: PAJAM Gear Up For Album Production Releases (01.08.06)

Record producers from Michigan
Songwriters from Michigan
Musicians from Detroit
American songwriting teams
Record production teams